Abaan is the moon god in the mythology of the Guaraní people of central South America.

According to the myth, Abaan had a huge nose, which he cut off.  When he threw it into the sky, it became the Moon.

He is described as being a culture hero of the Guaraní, with his brother Zaguaguayu.

See also 
Guaraní mythology
List of lunar deities

References

External links 
Abaangui

Guaraní deities
Lunar gods